St. Rose Dominican Hospital – San Martín Campus is a non-profit hospital owned and operated by Dignity Health and is located in Enterprise, Nevada. The hospital provides 147 beds all located in private rooms.

In late 2006, the San Martín Campus opened in the southwest corner of the valley becoming the third St. Rose Dominican facility in Southern Nevada and expanded the system's reach outside of Henderson.

History
One of the nation's five largest health care systems, Dignity Health is a 21-state network of nearly 9,000 physicians, 55,000 employees, and more than 380 care centers, including hospitals, urgent and occupational care, imaging centers, home health, and primary care clinics. Headquartered in San Francisco.

Services

 Opened in November 2006
 147 beds
 
 Services and Features:
 Cardiology/Electrophysiology (EP) Lab/Open Heart Surgery Center
 Chapel and chaplains
 Community Outreach Programs
 Emergency Department
 Get Well Network
 Healing Garden
 Home Health and Hospice services
 Intensive Care Unit
 Inpatient laboratory services
 In- and out-patient surgical and rehabilitative services
 Joint Replacement Center
 Level II Neonatal Intensive Care Unit
 Obstetrical services (Maternal Child Center)
 Palliative Care
 Pediatrics
 Radiology services, including digital diagnostics
 Respiratory
 Wound Healing & Hyperbaric Medicine Center

See also
 St. Rose Dominican Hospital – Rose de Lima Campus
 St. Rose Dominican Hospital – Siena Campus

References

External links
 

2006 establishments in Nevada
Buildings and structures in Spring Valley, Nevada
Dignity Health
Hospital buildings completed in 2006
Catholic hospitals in North America
Hospitals established in 2006
Hospitals in the Las Vegas Valley